The rusty-sided Atlantic tree-rat (Phyllomys pattoni), is a spiny rat species found in Brazil.

References

Phyllomys
Mammals described in 2002